The 2005 Appalachian State Mountaineers football team represented Appalachian State University as a member of the Southern Conference (SoCon) in the 2005 NCAA Division I-AA football season. The team was led by 17th-year head coach Jerry Moore and played their home games at Kidd Brewer Stadium in Boone, North Carolina.

The Mountaineers won the NCAA  Division I-AA Football Championship.Appalachian State is the only university  in North Carolina, public or private, to win a National Collegiate Athletic Association (NCAA) national championship in football.

Schedule

Game summaries

Eastern Kentucky

Kansas

Coastal Carolina

The Citadel

Furman

Georgia Southern

Wofford

Chattanooga

LSU

Western Carolina

Elon

Lafayette

Southern Illinois

Furman

Northern Iowa

Rankings

Awards and honors
 Southern Conference Coach of the Year (coaches and media) — Jerry Moore
 Southern Conference Roy M. "Legs" Hawley Offensive Player of the Year (media) — Richie Williams
 Southern Conference Offensive Player of the Year (coaches) — Richie Williams
 Southern Conference Jacobs Blocking Trophy — Matt Isenhour

Statistics

Team

Scores by quarter

References

Appalachian State
Appalachian State Mountaineers football seasons
NCAA Division I Football Champions
Southern Conference football champion seasons
Appalachian State Mountaineers football